Crybaby is the fourth mixtape by American emo-rap recording artist Lil Peep. It was released on June 10, 2016 independently and later posthumously re-released to streaming platforms on June 10, 2020 by AUTNMY via AWAL with 10 of the original 11 tracks.

Track listing
Credits adapted from Genius and Lil Peep's estate's website.
Notes

All songs are stylized in all lowercase. For example, "Crybaby" is stylized as "crybaby".
"Falling 4 Me" is not included in the 2020 rerelease of the mixtape due to sample clearance issues.
"Crybaby" samples "The No Seatbelt Song" by Brand New.
"Lil Jeep" samples "Two People" by Jacques Siroul.
"Yesterday" samples "Wonderwall" by Oasis.
"Ghost Girl" samples "In the Annexe" by Boards of Canada.
"Big City Blues" contains elements from "Tired Guitars" by Kholmogortsev Mark Igorevich.
"Skyscrapers (Love Now, Cry Later)" samples "Brothers on a Hotel Bed" by Death Cab for Cutie.
"Falling 4 Me" samples "Climbing Up the Walls" by Radiohead.
"Nineteen" samples "Broke" by Modest Mouse.
"White Tee" samples "Such Great Heights" by The Postal Service.
"Driveway" samples "I've Given Up on You" by Real Friends.

Charts

References 

2016 albums
2016 mixtape albums
Lil Peep albums
Self-released albums